The ninth season of the American reality talent show The Voice premiered on September 21, 2015 on NBC. Adam Levine, Blake Shelton, and Pharrell Williams returned as coaches for the season. Gwen Stefani returned after a one-season absence. Carson Daly continued as host.

The season introduced a "Coach Comeback" where each coach bring back one artist from the Battle or Knockout rounds to perform again in the Live Playoffs, and single elimination rounds during the Live Shows (except for the Semifinals).

Jordan Smith was named winner of the season, marking Adam Levine's third and final win as a coach.

Coaches
Adam Levine and Blake Shelton returned for their ninth season as coaches; Pharrell Williams, his third; and Gwen Stefani, her second season, after a season hiatus. The advisors for this season included Missy Elliott for Team Pharrell, John Fogerty for Team Adam, Brad Paisley for Team Blake, and Selena Gomez for Team Gwen. Rihanna served as an advisor for all teams during the Knockouts.

Teams
 Color key

Blind auditions
The first phase of the competition, the Blind Auditions, taped on June 29–30 and July 7–8, 2015, and began airing when the season premiered on September 21, 2015.

Color key

Episode 1 (Sept. 21)
The four coaches performed a medley of each other's songs, including "Neon Light", "Don't Speak", "Sugar" and "Get Lucky", which were sung by Gwen Stefani, Blake Shelton, Pharrell Williams, and Adam Levine, respectively.

Episode 2 (Sept. 22)

Episode 3 (Sept. 28)

Episode 4 (Sept. 29)

Episode 5 (Oct. 5)

Episode 6 (Oct. 6)
Episode 6, titled "The Best of The Blind Auditions," recalled the Blind Auditions this season.

The Battles
The Battles (episodes 7 to 10) consisted of two 2-hour episodes and two 1-hour episodes each on October 12, 13, 19 and 20, 2015. Season nine's advisors are Missy Elliott for Team Pharrell, John Fogerty for Team Adam, Brad Paisley for Team Blake, and Selena Gomez for Team Gwen. As like the previous battle rounds since season three, each coach can exercise a use of two steals to save two losing artists from opposing coaches to put through to the Knockouts. At the end of the Knockouts, each coach reinstate a previously eliminated artist from either the Battles or Knockouts to participate in the Live Playoffs.

Color key:

The Knockouts
For the Knockouts, Rihanna was assigned as a mentor for contestants in all four teams. As in previous seasons, the coaches can steal one losing artist. The top 20 contestants will then move on to the Live Shows.

Color key:

1 Chance Peña is on Team Adam for the Live Shows.

Live shows
The Live Shows is the final phase of the competition. It consists of six weeks of live shows starting with the playoffs and ending on the season finale. The traditional iTunes multiplier bonus begins with the Live Playoffs and continues through the end of the semi-finals. The Instant Save feature applies starting on the top 12 week until the semi-finals.

For the first time in the show's history, a "Coach Comeback" feature was introduced where each coach reinstated one previously eliminated artist from the Battles or Knockouts to perform in the Live Playoffs with the top 20 and will get a chance to move on to the live shows as part of the top 12.

Color key:

Week 1: Live Playoffs (Nov. 9, 10 & 11)
The Live Playoffs comprises episodes 15, 16, and 17 (the results show). The top 24 artists perform, with the two artists per each team advances via public vote, while the bottom four artists compete for the coaches' save in the results show. The Monday broadcast featured Teams Adam and Gwen, while the Tuesday broadcast featured Teams Pharrell and Blake.

Jordan Smith's "Halo" reached #3 on iTunes and Emily Ann Roberts' "In The Garden" peaked at #6; both received iTunes bonus multipliers in their respective voting windows.

Week 2: Top 12 (Nov. 16 & 17)
In-lieu of the bottom three and the double elimination in contrast of previous seasons, this week feature single elimination until week four. The two artists with the lowest votes then performed in the Instant Save and faced the Twitter's votes.

iTunes bonus multipliers were awarded to Jordan Smith (#1), Amy Vachal (#6), and Jeffery Austin (#9).

Week 3: Top 11 (Nov. 23 & 24)
iTunes bonus multipliers were awarded to Vachal (#4), Smith (#8) and Emily Ann Roberts (#10).

Week 4: Top 10 (Nov. 30 & Dec. 1)
iTunes bonus multipliers were awarded to Smith (#2), Barrett Baber (#3), Madi Davis (#4), Ann Roberts (#5), Austin (#7), Amy Vachal (#8) and Shelby Brown (#9).

Week 5: Semifinals (Dec. 7 & 8)
Five artists were eliminated on the semifinals. During the results, the top three artists with the most votes were immediately advanced the finals, the bottom three artists with the fewest votes were eliminated immediately, and the middle three artists were eligible for the Instant Save.

iTunes bonus multipliers were awarded for the most number of artists (eight, surpassing seven on the previous week) in a single week of shows in The Voice history, those being Smith (#1), Austin (#3), Ann Roberts (#4), Davis (#5), Vachal (#6), Braiden Sunshine (#7), Zach Seabaugh (#8) and Barrett Baber (#9). With the elimination of Davis, Williams no longer has any more artists left on his team.

Week 6: Finale (Dec. 14 & 15)
The Final four performed on Monday, December 14, 2015, with the final results following on Tuesday, December 15, 2015. Finalists performed a solo song, a duet with their coach, and a Christmas song. As per usual, no iTunes bonuses are awarded for Finale performances, with all season's iTunes votes for each artist counted cumulatively.

The contestant's song choices reach the top 10 on iTunes for Jordan Smith (#1, #3 and #5), Emily Ann Roberts (#2 and #6), Barrett Baber (#7), Jeffery Austin (#9).

Elimination chart

Overall
Color key
Artist's info

Result details

Team
Color key
Artist's info

Result details

Performances by guests/coaches

Ratings
The season nine premiere was watched by 12.37 million viewers with a 3.5 rating in the 18–49 demographic. It was down from last season's premiere by .48 million viewers.

Artists' appearances in other media
Darius Scott moved into songwriting, co-writing 9 songs on Chance the Rapper's The Big Day. He was subsequently signed to a record deal with Roc Nation, releasing his album 004DAISY under the DIXSON moniker in 2022, and also co-wrote "Be Alive" with Beyoncé for the film King Richard, receiving nominations for a Grammy, Academy Award, and Golden Globe. His written contributions to Beyoncé's Renaissance are currently nominated for Album of the Year at the 65th Annual Grammy Awards. 
Ivonne Acero sang in the blind auditions for season eight, but failed to turn any chairs. She later appeared in the first season of the American-Spanish version of this show, and was eliminated during the battle rounds.
Manny Cabo later appeared in the first season of the American-Spanish version of this show, but was eliminated in the Live Playoffs.
Keith Semple lost his "golden ticket" on the ninth season of American Idol due to his legal status and residency considerations and was a winner on Popstars: The Rivals, a British singing competition; consequently, he became a member of the boyband One True Voice (OTV) in 2002.
Viktor Király previously competed to represent Hungary in the Eurovision Song Contest, an international song contest in Europe, 2 times in 2012 (with his siblings, including another well-known singer in Hungary Linda Király) and 2014, and both times nearly winning the competition. He has also won the 4th season of Megasztár, a show similar to American Idol.
Caleb Lee Hutchinson who scored no chair turns this season appeared on the 16th season of American Idol and became the runner-up of the competition.
 Jordan Smith appeared on American Song Contest representing Kentucky and finished in 3rd Place.

References

External links

Season 09
2015 American television seasons